Bosea is a genus of evergreen, woody shrubs contains 3 species that are geographically widely separated; one in the Canary Islands, one in Cyprus and one in the western Himalayas. The species have many crowded cane-like stems from ground level grow to medium to tall shrubs, smallish simple leaves with smooth margins, and tiny white-to-green flowers in branched spikes at end of branches. The fruits are small berries, which have varied local uses as food plants and in traditional medicine.

Cultivation
Although rarely found in cultivation they are easily grown in any well-drained soil in full sun or warm sheltered position in climates from cool temperate to temperate. They re-sprout vigorously after being cut back and can be grown as an ornamental or informal kind of hedge. They can be propagated from cuttings, seed or root division.

Species
The three species in the genus:
Bosea amherstiana
Bosea cypria
Bosea yervamora

References

External links
Botanica Sistematica

Amaranthaceae
Amaranthaceae genera